Luis Pechenino (2 December 1925 – 18 June 2010) was an Argentine rower. He competed in the men's eight event at the 1948 Summer Olympics.

References

External links
 

1925 births
2010 deaths
Argentine male rowers
Olympic rowers of Argentina
Rowers at the 1948 Summer Olympics
Sportspeople from Rosario, Santa Fe
Pan American Games medalists in rowing
Pan American Games gold medalists for Argentina
Rowers at the 1951 Pan American Games
Rowers at the 1955 Pan American Games